Pseuduvaria taipingensis is a species of plant in the family Annonaceae. It is a tree endemic to Peninsular Malaysia. James Sinclair, the Scottish botanist who first formally described the species, named it after Taiping a city in Perak, Malaysia where the specimen he examined was collected.

Description
It is a small tree. The young, yellow to brown branches are densely hairy, but become hairless with maturity. Its egg-shaped to elliptical, slightly leathery leaves are 16.5-30 by 6-11.5 centimeters. The leaves have heart-shaped to rounded bases and tapering tips, with the tapering portion 14-23 millimeters long. The leaves are hairless. The leaves have 14-18 pairs of secondary veins emanating from their midribs. Its densely hairy petioles are 5 by 1.5-4 millimeters with a broad groove on their upper side. Its solitary Inflorescences occur on branches, and are organized on very densely hairy peduncles that are 1.5 by 1 millimeters. Each inflorescence has up to 1-2 flowers. Each flower is on a very densely hairy pedicel that is 18-20 by 0.5 millimeters. The pedicels are organized on a rachis up to 5 millimeters long that have 2 bracts. The pedicels have a medial, very densely hairy bract that is up to 1 millimeter long. Its flowers are unisexual. Its flowers have 3 free, triangular sepals, that are 1.5 by 1.5 millimeters. The sepals are hairless on their upper surface, densely hairy on their lower surface, and hairy at their margins. Its 6 petals are arranged in two rows of 3. The yellow, egg-shaped, outer petals are 2.5 by 2.5 millimeters with hairless upper and very densely hairy lower surfaces. The yellow, heart-shaped inner petals have a 4.5 millimeter long claw at their base and a 7.5 by 4.5 millimeter blade. The inner petals have heart-shaped bases and pointed tips. The inner petals are sparsely hairy on their upper surfaces and densely hairy on lower surfaces. The inner surface of the inner petals has a solitary, smooth, slightly raised, irregularly shaped gland. The male flowers have up to 40 stamens that are 0.5-0.8 by 0.5-0.8 millimeters. The solitary fruit are organized on sparsely hairy peduncles that are 5 by 1 millimeters. The fruit are attached by sparseliy hairy pedicles that are 18-26 by 1-1.5 millimeters. The yellow to brown-purple, globe-shaped fruit are 15-20 by 14-18 millimeters. The fruit are smooth, and densely hairy. Each fruit has up to 2-4 hemispherical to lens-shaped, wrinkly seeds that are 10 by 10 by 5 millimeters. Each seed has a 0.5-0.8 by 0.3-0.5 millimeter elliptical hilum. The seeds are arranged in two rows in the fruit.

Reproductive biology
The pollen of P. taipingensis is shed as permanent tetrads.

Habitat and distribution
It has been observed growing in dense forests below mountains at elevations up to 1400 meters.

References

taipingensis
Endemic flora of Peninsular Malaysia
Trees of Peninsular Malaysia
Conservation dependent plants
Near threatened flora of Asia
Taxonomy articles created by Polbot
Taxa named by James Sinclair (botanist)
Plants described in 1955